Zlokuḱani may refer to:
 Zlokuḱani, Bitola, North Macedonia
 Zlokuḱani, Karpoš, North Macedonia